Suggestopedia, a portmanteau of "suggestion" and "pedagogy" is a teaching method used to learn foreign languages developed by the Bulgarian psychiatrist Georgi Lozanov. It is also known as desuggestopedia. 

First developed in the 1970s, suggestopedia utilised positive suggestions in teaching language. In 1978, Lozanov presented the method to a commission in Paris at UNESCO. Two years later in 1980, UNESCO issued their final report with various mixed views on of the theory. On the one hand, it affirmed suggestopedia as a language learning technique for second-language speakers, but the report also included various criticisms of the theory.

Practice
Suggestopedia asserts that the physical surroundings and atmosphere of classroom are vital factors in making sure that "students feel comfortable and confident". It also promotes various techniques, including art and music, in teaching languages. The pedagogy of suggestopedia consists of three phases: deciphering, concert session, and elaboration.

Deciphering: In the deciphering phase, a teacher introduces to their students some written or spoken content. In most materials the foreign-language text is on the left half of the page with a translation on the right half.

Concert session: The concert session phase consists of active and passive sessions. In the active session, the teacher reads the text at a normal speed, while their students follow. In the passive session, the students relax and listen to the teacher reading the text. Baroque music is played in the background.

Elaboration: The students express what they have learned through acting, songs, and games.

A fourth phrase, production, is also sometimes used.

Production: The students spontaneously speak and interact in the target language without interruption or correction.

Suggestopedia teachers
Suggestopedia asserts that teachers should not act in a directive way. For example, teachers should act as partners to their students, participating in activities such as games and songs "naturally" and "genuinely". Lozanov asserts that teachers should be versed in the "communication in the spirit of love, respect for man as a human being, the specific humanitarian way of applying their 'techniques' ".

Suggestopedia for children
The suggestopedia pedagogy for adult learners includes long sessions without movement, and other techniques that Lozanov claims are effective for adults. Luzanov asserts that children have brains that are more delicate than those of adults, and another approach should be applied to children. Suggestopedia lessons for children are shorter in order to keep children away from the negative pedagogical suggestions of society.

Claims
As a pseudoscience, suggestopedia is claimed to impart better health and intellectual abilities onto its learners. Lozanov claims that the effect of suggestopedia is in not only language learning but also producing favorable side effects on health, the social and psychological relations, and the subsequent success in other subjects.

Criticism

Suggestopedia has been called a "pseudo-science". In response, Lozanov claimed that Suggestopedia cannot be compared to a placebo as he regarded placebos as being effective. Another point of criticism is brought forward by Baur, who claims that in suggestopedia students only receive input by listening, reading and musical-emotional backing, while other important factors of language acquisition are being neglected. Several other features of the method – like the 'nonconscious' acquisition of language, or bringing the learner into a childlike state – are questioned by critics. Lukesch also claims that Suggestopedia lacks scientific backing and is criticized by psychologists as being based on pseudoscience.

Later variations

Suggestopedia yielded four main offshoots. The first – still called Suggestopedia, and developed in eastern Europe – used different techniques from Lozanov's original version. The other three are named Superlearning, Suggestive Accelerated Learning and Teaching (SALT), and Psychopädie. Superlearning and SALT originated in North America, while Psychopädie was developed in West Germany. While all four are slightly different from the original Suggestopedia and from each other, they still share the common traits of music, relaxation, and suggestion.

References

Idiomos Aprendizagem Acelerada = http://www.idiomos.com
Edelmann, Walter, Suggestgopädie/Superlearning, Heidelberg: Ansanger, 1998.
Lozanov, Georgi, Suggestology and Outlines of Suggestopedy, New York: Gordon & Breach 1978.
Meier, Josef, Mehr Freude und Erfolg beim Englischlernen mit innovativen Lern- und Mentaltechniken, München:IBS, 1999.
Riedel, Katja, Persönlichkeitsentfaltung durch Suggestopädie, Hohengehren: Schneider, 1995.
Schiffler, Ludger, Suggestopädie und Superlearning - empirisch geprüft. Einführung und Weiterentwicklung für Schule und Erwachsenenbildung, Frankfurt am Main: Diesterweg, 1989.
Schiffler, Ludger, La Suggestopédie et le Superlearning - Mise à l'épreuve statistique, Paris: Didier Erudition, 1991.
Schiffler, Ludger: "Suggestopedic Methods and Applications", Philadelphia, Tokyo, Paris etc.: Gordon & Breach Science Publisher, 1992.
Schiffler, Ludger, Effektiver Fremdsprachen lehren und lernen - Beide Gehirnhälften aktivieren, Donauwörth: Auer, 2002.
Schiffler, Ludger, Interhemispheric Foreign Language Learning - Activating Both Sides of the Brain, online 2003 (732KB )(download available: http://www.ludger-schiffler.de).
Negrete, Paulo Sergio, Accelerating the Foreign Language Teaching Through Suggestopedia/Neuropedia, published in 2015.

External links
  No longer online.

Language-teaching methodology
Pseudoscience